Bagatelle is a Canadian children's television series which aired on CBC Television in 1974.

Premise
This series was geared towards children before age 10. The first part of each episode, Au jardin de Pierrot, featured francophone folk songs for young children as hosted by Pierrette Boucher. This segment was set in a playground. It was produced by Maurice Falardeau at Radio-Canada. The programme concluded with a short Canadian-produced film from a studio such as Communicalp Film Productions (Vancouver), Moreland Latchford, Nelvana and the Visual Education Centre.

Scheduling
This half-hour series was broadcast Fridays at 4:30 p.m. from 5 April to 6 September 1974.

References

External links
 

CBC Television original programming
1974 Canadian television series debuts
1974 Canadian television series endings